Public art in Crown Hill Cemetery, Indianapolis, includes:

See also
 List of public art in Indianapolis

References

Crown Hill Cemetery
Crown Hill Cemetery